Markus Haapanen (born 28 January 1996) is a Finnish ice hockey defenceman. He is currently playing with GKS Hockey in the Hockeytvåan, the fourth-tier league in Sweden.

Haapanen made his Liiga debut playing with HPK during the 2014–15 Liiga season and went on to play in nine regular season games for the team.

References

External links

1996 births
Living people
Finnish ice hockey defencemen
HPK players
KOOVEE players
Lempäälän Kisa players
People from Hämeenlinna
Ice hockey players at the 2012 Winter Youth Olympics
Youth Olympic gold medalists for Finland
Sportspeople from Kanta-Häme
21st-century Finnish people